The Regional Snowfall Index (RSI) is a system used by NOAA to assess the societal impact of winter storms in the United States. The system is a replacement for the Northeast Snowfall Impact Scale (NESIS) system which, unlike the former; assesses winter storm impacts outside of the Northeastern United States. Since its initiation the NCDC has retroactively assigned RSI values to over 500 historical storms since 1900.

Storms are ranked from Category 0 to 5 on the scale; with the former being classified as "Nuisance" and the latter as "Extreme". The impact of the storms is assessed in six different regions of the United States: the Northeast, Northern Rockies and Plains, Ohio Valley, South, Southeast and the Upper Midwest. A Category 5 Extreme ranking is indicated by a numerical score of 18 or higher on the scale.

Out of the over 500 historical storms assessed since 1900, only twenty-six storms have been given a Category 5 ranking. The highest ranking storm on the list is the Great Blizzard of 1978 which scored a value of 39.07. The most recent storm to receive a Category 5 ranking is the January 2016 United States blizzard which scored a value of 20.14. The following list orders the storms chronologically.

List of Category 5 events

Listed by month

See also

List of Regional Snowfall Index Category 4 winter storms
List of Northeast Snowfall Impact Scale winter storms
List of blizzards

References

Climate of the United States
winter storms
Weather events in the United States